A Military Encyclopedia or Farrow's Military Encyclopedia is an
American encyclopedia published in New York in 1885. The contents of A Military Encyclopedia are now in the public domain.

Vol.I. (Abaca to Gyves); 821 pages, 500+ illus. plus 37 plates of illustration
Vol.II (Habeas Corpus to Ryswick); 832 pages, 500+ illus. plus 25 plates of illustrations 
Vol.III (Sabander to Zundnadelgewerr); 668 pages, 500+ illus. plus 26 plates of illustrations

External links

Military/Info Publishing

Encyclopedias of the military
Reference works in the public domain